Richmond is a coastal city in the Lower Mainland region of British Columbia, Canada. It occupies almost the entirety of Lulu Island (excluding Queensborough), between the two estuarine distributaries of the Fraser River. Encompassing the adjacent Sea Island (where the Vancouver International Airport is located) and several other smaller islands and uninhabited islets to its north and south, it neighbours Vancouver and Burnaby on the Burrard Peninsula to the north, New Westminster and Annacis Island to the east, Delta to the south, and the Strait of Georgia to the west.

The Coast Salish peoples were the first people to inhabit the area of Richmond, with the Musqueam Band naming the site near Terra Nova "" or "boiling point".

As a member municipality of Metro Vancouver, Richmond is composed of eight local neighbourhoods: Sea Island, City Centre, Thompson, West Richmond, Steveston, South Arm, East Richmond and Hamilton. As of 2022, the city has an estimated population of 230,584 people.

During the 2010 Winter Olympics, the Richmond Olympic Oval was a venue for long track speed skating events.

History
Coast Salish bands had temporary camps on the island, to fish and collect berries, which were scattered and moved from year to year. Certain Coast Salish summer camps were located at Garry Point, and Woodward's Landing, along with the site of the Terra Nova cannery, which had at one time been a Musqueam village.

There is no definitive historical account as to how Richmond was named. There are several possibilities that have been proposed, including:
 The first family to settle in Richmond, that of Hugh McRoberts, had formerly lived in Australia. Their home there was called "Richmond View" and that is what they named their homestead in Richmond.
 W.D. Ferris drafted the original petition for the incorporation of The Township of Richmond. He was originally from Richmond, Surrey, England.
 Another early settler was Hugh Boyd. He was also the first Reeve of the township. His wife had been born in Richmond, Yorkshire, England.

The Township of Richmond, British Columbia incorporated on 10 November 1879. The Township of Richmond was modeled after Ontario's political townships – an incorporated municipality, consisting of communities that are united as a single entity with a single municipal administration. Each community was represented on the municipal council through a ward electoral system with five wards until 1946 when the ward electoral system was replaced with the at large electoral system that is currently in place.

On 3 December 1990, Richmond was designated as a City.

The first Town Hall, the Agricultural Hall and the Methodist Church (now Minoru Chapel), were built at the corner of No. 17 (River) Rd and No. 20 (Cambie) Rd near the main settlement on the northwestern tip of Lulu Island at North Arm.

The old fishing village of Steveston on the southwestern tip of Lulu Island is now home to several museums and heritage sites, as well as a working harbour for fishing boats. Currently, London Heritage Farm, the Gulf of Georgia Cannery and the Britannia Shipyard National Historic Site in Steveston highlight these parts of Richmond's diverse history.

Geography
Richmond is made up of most of the islands in the Fraser River delta, the largest and most populated island being Lulu Island. The city of Richmond includes all but a small portion of Lulu Island (the Queensborough neighbourhood at the far eastern tip is part of the city of New Westminster). The next largest island, Sea Island, is home to the Vancouver International Airport (YVR). In addition to Lulu and Sea Islands, 15 smaller islands make up the city's  land area, including:
 Mitchell Island, an industrial island accessed via the Knight Street Bridge, a bridge which connects Richmond and Vancouver.
 Richmond Island, a former sand bar that has been turned into a peninsula that can only be reached from Vancouver, but technically is within Richmond's city limits. 
 Shady Island, an uninhabited island covered with trees, which can be reached over land by foot at low tide from near Steveston.

The city also includes the fishing village of Steveston, located in the far southwest corner of the city, and Burkeville, which shares Sea Island with the airport. Both Steveston and Burkeville were independent villages until they were annexed by Richmond.

Since all of Richmond occupies islands in a river delta, the city has plenty of rich, alluvial soil for agriculture, and was one of the first areas in British Columbia to be farmed by Europeans in the 19th century. The drawback of Richmond's geographical location was that since all the land averages just one metre above sea level, it was prone to flooding, especially during high tide. As a result, all the major islands are now surrounded by a system of dykes, which, although not as massive as those in the Netherlands or the levees of New Orleans, serve to protect the town from anticipated sources of flooding. There is a possibility that, during an earthquake, the dykes could rupture and the alluvial soil may liquefy, causing extensive damage. Richmond is also at risk of a major flood if the Fraser River has an unusually high spring freshet.

Because of the high groundwater table, very few houses in Richmond have basements and until the late 1980s, very few buildings were above 3 storeys high.

Climate
Richmond has an oceanic climate (Cfb). Because it is not as close to the mountains, it actually receives 30% less rain than neighbouring Vancouver. It rarely snows in winter and the summer temperatures are mild to warm. Richmond is also very cloudy in the cooler months.

Demographics 

The average age of the population was 43.3 years old, and the median age of the population was 43.6. Of the population 13.3 percent was 0 to 14 years of age, 20 percent was 65 years and over, 2.4 percent was 85 years and over, and 66.7 percent was the age 15 to 64 years old. Richmond's 2021 population of 209,937 makes it the fourth-largest city in British Columbia, after Vancouver (662,248), Surrey (568,322) and Burnaby (249,125).

The average size of a household in Richmond is 2.6 persons. Most households have a household size of 2 persons, and the least households have 5 or more persons. Apartment buildings are the most common structural type of dwellings, made up of 18,590 apartment in a building that has fewer than five storeys, 15,475 apartment in a building that has five or more storeys, and 4,990 apartment or flat in a duplex. Single-detached houses are also popular with 24,435 single-detached houses located in Richmond. Other types of buildings include 1,585, semi-detached houses 15,945 row houses, 20 other single-attached houses, and 45 movable dwellings.

The average price of a detached home in Richmond is $1,581,600.

Richmond has an immigrant population of 60%, the highest in Canada.

Richmond is also home to two of the largest Buddhist temples in North America, the International Buddhist Temple and the Ling Yen Mountain Temple.

Ethnicity 
Over 50% of Richmond residents identify as Chinese, making it the city in North America with the largest proportion of Asians. Almost three quarters of its population is of Asian descent, many of whom immigrated in the late 1980s, mostly from Hong Kong, Taiwan, and Mainland China. Other Asian Canadians in Richmond include Indian Canadians, Filipino Canadians and Japanese Canadians.

Richmond's Japanese community has a long history in Steveston dating back to the 1800s. Following Japan's 1941 attack on Pearl Harbor, the Anti-Japanese sentiment grew and this community was devastated as residents of Japanese descent were relocated to internment camps in the BC Interior and Alberta and their property sold at auction.

Languages 
The 2021 census found that English was spoken as mother tongue by 31.31% of the population. The next most common mother tongue language was Cantonese, spoken by 21.52% of the population, followed by Mandarin at 21.08%.

Religion 
According to the 2021 census, religious groups in Richmond included:
Irreligion (111,140 persons or 53.3%)
Christianity (64,405 persons or 30.9%)
Buddhism (11,590 persons or 5.6%)
Islam (7,630 persons or 3.7%)
Sikhism (6,985 persons or 3.4%)
Hinduism (2,605 persons or 1.3%)
Judaism (2,515 persons or 1.2%)
Indigenous spirituality (40 persons or <0.1%)

Economy

Richmond supports about 100,000 jobs in various areas including services, retailing, tourism, light manufacturing, airport services and aviation, agriculture, fishing, and government. Richmond also is a leading centre in the region for high-technology companies, including Norsat and Sierra Wireless.

Pacific Coastal Airlines has its headquarters in the South Terminal of Vancouver International Airport. Air Canada Jazz operates a regional office in Richmond.

Before its dissolution, Canadian Airlines operated an office in Richmond. Before it merged into Air Canada Jazz, regional airline Air BC was headquartered in Richmond. Prior to its dissolution, Harmony Airways, Pacific Western Airlines and Canadian Pacific Air Lines were all headquartered in Richmond.

The first McDonald's restaurant outside of the United States was opened in Richmond in June 1967.

Agriculture
The Agricultural Land Reserve preserves 4,916 hectares within the city as farmland, an area that makes up most of east Richmond. Of this area, 3,012 hectares are farmed by 247 farms; the rest is either vacant or occupied by non-farm uses. Cranberries and blueberries are the dominant crops grown. Other crops grown include strawberries, corn, and potatoes. In 2001 Richmond had approximately 47% of BC's cranberry acreage.

Shopping malls
Richmond Centre, Lansdowne Centre, McArthurGlen Vancouver, Parker Place and Aberdeen Centre are some of the most prominent malls in Richmond. There is also Steveston Village.

Success from these malls has created significant economical growth in Richmond. Richmond Centre has become Canada's 12th most profitable mall. Offices, apartment buildings, and transportation hubs have sprung up around the mall. While McArthurGlen Vancouver has been given the Best Outlet Centre 2015 award at MAPIC.

Richmond is also home to many Chinese-oriented shopping malls, most of them along No. 3 Road from Alderbridge Way to Capstan Way. This area is officially termed as the "Golden Village" by Tourism Richmond and includes malls such as Aberdeen Centre, Continental Centre, Union Square, President Plaza, Parker Place, and Yaohan Centre. The strip malls located on Alexandra Road are famous for their restaurants and the area is more commonly known as "food street".

Development
Richmond city planners are one year into their update of its official plan, passed in fall 2019, for the city centre. The plan is anchored by the Canada Line and includes the development of nine transit-oriented village centres. The population of the area is expected to grow from about 40,000 to 120,000 residents.

According to a senior planner for the city, the goal of the plan is to "turn the middle arm of the Fraser River into a focus instead of an edge." A Richmond parks manager said that for "too long residents have felt contained by the river, seen it as being to their backs. Now, they want people to face the river and embrace the waterfront."

Lansdowne 
Lansdowne Centre will be closing in 2025 to make way for 24 towers. Within this development plan, there will be mixed housing, large public spaces with a Civic Plaza slated to be placed in the corner of Lansdowne Road and No 3 Road. The property owner, Vanprop Investment Inc., has plans for Lansdowne to be a pedestrian-friendly area with shops and services lined within its block.

The Olympic Oval 

Aspac Developments Ltd purchased  of land adjacent to the Fraser River and the finished $178 million Richmond Olympic Oval. The $1 billion plan includes 16 high-density towers, up to 14 stories in height. The towers will be stepped toward the waterfront and will include trees and green space. Aspac's plans are for "probably the highest-end development Richmond has seen to date" said Mayor Brodie. A $2.3 million hard-surfaced path will be constructed along the river to link the project to Aberdeen Centre. Some construction will not begin until after 2010, and will take up to 12 years to complete. The warehouses and commercial parks near the development are also slated for redevelopment.

The John M.S. Lecky boathouse 
The University of British Columbia constructed the John M.S. Lecky boathouse along River Road. It draws crowds from rowing regattas and dragon boat races.

Cambie Road pedestrian bridge 
A possible pedestrian bridge where Cambie Road reaches the river is also being included in a future vision of the area. It would link nature trails on the north and south banks, and make Aberdeen Centre within walking distance for BCIT's aerospace campus students.

Capstan Way 

Developer Pinnacle International is planning a 16-building development on a  property near Capstan Way and No 3 road. The mixed-use development would include over 2,100 residential units, various commercial uses, and a hotel.

The Canada Line is considered critical to the project. A fifth Richmond station at Capstan Way (No. 3 Road and Capstan Way) was originally planned but was cancelled in March 2009. This station was considered so critical to the development that the City of Richmond has received $19 million from developers for the station to be built. TransLink, the Canada Line operator, has started designing this station in November 2017. On 2 September 2021, construction started on Capstan station.

Also included will be 100 affordable housing units, a 25-space daycare, and a  park. The developers are also proposing live-work dwellings, where shop owners would live above their ground-level operations.

Aberdeen Square 
Fairchild Developments built a six-floor expansion to its Chinese-oriented shopping centre, Aberdeen Centre. The plan includes an office building and a link to the Canada Line's Aberdeen station. The new complex was completed and opened up to the public in 2014.

Bridgeport Station 
The River Rock Casino Resort is located near the Canada Line Bridgeport station and has built a 12-story hotel. The casino has added an addition above the newly added six-story car park and SkyTrain Bridgeport Station. TransLink (the Canada Line owner) gave the Great Canadian Casino Corporation land worth $9.5 million, and $4.5 million in cash in return for building the park-and-ride facility. Transit users are charged $3.00 per day to use the facility (up from an initial $2.00 charge).

Garden City Lands 

The  parcel known as the Garden City Lands was leased by the federal government for decades and was formerly used as a transmitter site for program requirements of the Canadian Coast Guard. The property is bounded by Westminster Highway, Garden City Road, Alderbridge Way and No. 4 Road and has been within the Provincial Agricultural Land Reserve (ALR) since 1973. In 2005, the Federal Government of Canada deemed the land as "surplus" to its needs and sold the site to the Canada Lands Company, a federal Crown corporation.

The City of Richmond, Canada Lands Company, and the Musqueam Indian Band entered a 2005 agreement with the federal government that included the intent to remove the land from the ALR for the purposes of high-density development. In April 2008, an application to exclude the land from the Agricultural Land Reserve was made to the Agricultural Land Commission. The application was rejected on 10 February 2009.

On 8 March 2010, Richmond City Council announced a deal had been approved whereby the city would purchase the entire parcel of land from the Musqueam Band and Canada Lands Company for $59.2 million.

The Musqueam band has since brought a lawsuit against the City of Richmond claiming they sold it under duress. The lawsuit remains dormant and it is the understanding of Coun. Harold Steves that the lawsuit will remain dormant unless the city wants to develop the lands into anything that is not related to ALR use.

Arts and culture
On Canada Day, Richmond has an annual festival in Steveston called the Steveston Salmon Festival. This event includes a parade, and a huge barbecued salmon sale in front of the Steveston Community Centre. Locally based municipal, provincial and federal politicians frequently show up at this event, usually as part of the parade and/or to hand out Canadian flags.

An annual Richmond Maritime Festival has been held at the Britannia Shipyard, National Historic Site every August since 2004. It is a family event that celebrates the region's maritime heritage with live entertainment, ships, exhibits and demonstrations.

In 2002, Richmond hosted a tall ships festival which attracted an estimated 400,000 people to Steveston. The success of this event surpassed many expectations and caused traffic congestion in the usually quiet area. There was insufficient parking in the area, which gave locals the idea of selling "parking space" by using their driveways and front yards. Despite the event's popularity, there was a revenue shortfall and the city decided not to host the event again.

Many indoor and outdoor art exhibitions are hosted by Richmond Arts Coalition (RAC) throughout the year. The Richmond Arts Strategy, passed in July 2004 by the City of Richmond, includes a proposal to promote communication between arts organizations and develop the Richmond arts community. In January 2005, a Board, mission, and mandate was established. On 1 November 2005, artists, art organizations, and patrons of the arts formed the Richmond Arts Coalition. The RAC hosts Richmond arts events, connect the public to artists and events, provide artist opportunities, nominate awards, fund performers to specific events, stimulate arts projects, and advocate for arts issues, performances, education, creation, and exhibition activities.

During the summer weekends, an annual Richmond Night Market is held. Toys, clothes, cell phones, and food are available along with live entertainment. It is very popular and is usually crowded.

Richmond also hosted the 2006 Gemini Awards, which were held at River Rock Casino. This marked the first time the ceremony had taken place on the West Coast, as it traditionally takes place in Toronto.

Parks and recreation

Sports
Richmond is home to the Richmond Sockeyes Junior B hockey team. Richmond also has two swim clubs: the Kigoos summer swimming club and the Richmond Rapids Swim Club. Richmond also has multiple soccer teams, under the name Richmond FC, ranging in ages and skill levels, from U4's to U18's, and from house divisions to elite programming. As of 1 October 2006, the middle arm of Richmond's Fraser River became home to both the UBC Thunderbirds varsity rowing program and St. George's School rowing program, with the completion of the new $6 million CAD John M.S. Lecky UBC Boathouse. In addition, this facility will also function to enhance participation in the sports of rowing and dragon boating for the greater community, including youth, adults, and rowing alumni. Richmond also has their own short track speed skating club, the Richmond Rockets and their own rugby union club, the Richmond Rugby Football Club.

The 2010 Winter Olympics

For the 2010 Winter Olympics in Vancouver, the City of Richmond constructed an 8,000-seat speed-skating oval near the No. 2 Road Bridge, just across (the middle arm of) the Fraser River from Vancouver International Airport. The final construction cost (paid for by the city, the provincial government and the federal government) is around $178 million CAD. Since the completion of the Games, the oval has served as a recreational structure for local residents. The Richmond Oval officially opened on 12 December 2008. The city received $141 million CAD from ASPAC Developments for city-owned land next to the Oval. The sale more than covers the unfunded portion of the Oval's price tag.

Government

Richmond votes regularly for conservative or centrist parties, and is a stronghold for the BC Liberal Party.

Municipal
Richmond's municipal council is elected using an at-large electoral system.
 
Like Vancouver, but unlike most cities in British Columbia, Richmond runs on a political system of locally based political parties, or slates. For the most part, however, their organization is weak and they may collapse or change names from one election to another.

Local government includes a 9-member city council and a 7-member school board. City council consists of a mayor and 8 councillors. The current mayor of Richmond is Malcolm Brodie, who is serving his 6th term as mayor. The last elections were held in October 2018.

In the 2018 city elections, the RCA (Richmond Citizen's Association) party, the Richmond First party, and the RITE Richmond party all won 2 seats, the Richmond Community Coalition won one seat, and there is one independent. On the Richmond Board of Education, the Richmond Education Party won three seats, the Richmond First Party won two seats, and there are two independents.

Provincial
In the Legislative Assembly of British Columbia, Richmond is a stronghold of the BC Liberal Party. In the most recent provincial election in 2020, the NDP flipped three of Richmond's four electoral districts (Richmond South Centre, Richmond-Queensborough, and Richmond-Steveston).

Federal
In the House of Commons of Canada, Richmond is divided between two electoral districts: Richmond Centre, which encompasses the city's centre and west, and Steveston—Richmond East, which encompasses the south and east. In the 2021 federal election, the Liberal Party won Richmond Centre and Steveston—Richmond East.

Infrastructure

Transportation

Richmond is connected by a system of bridges and tunnels to Vancouver and Delta, and through the New Westminster suburb of Queensborough (on eastern Lulu Island) to the "mainland" portion of New Westminster. Three bridges (one of them twinned) connect Lulu Island to Sea Island and the Vancouver International Airport; one bridge connects Sea Island and the Vancouver International Airport to Vancouver; two bridges connect Lulu Island to Vancouver; one bridge connects Queensborough (on eastern Lulu Island) to New Westminster; one bridge connects Queensborough to Annacis Island in Delta; one twinned bridge connects Richmond to Annacis Island; and one of the few underwater tunnels in British Columbia connects Richmond to Delta.

Richmond is served by two freeways: Highway 99, which connects to Interstate 5 at the border with the United States, and Highway 91, which connects Delta, New Westminster, and Richmond.

Railway bridges connect Lulu Island to Vancouver, New Westminster, and Annacis Island, and serve the Canadian National and Canadian Pacific Railways, as well as the Southern Railway of British Columbia (although the latter railway's Lulu Island trackage is entirely within Queensborough).

The public transit system in Metro Vancouver, planned and funded by TransLink, currently has bus and rail connections from Richmond to Downtown Vancouver, Surrey, New Westminster, Burnaby, Delta and the University of British Columbia. The Canada Line is a SkyTrain rail line, connecting both Richmond Centre and the airport to Downtown Vancouver and to points in between, opened on Monday, 17 August 2009. The Canada Line provides travel to Downtown Vancouver in 25 minutes with a frequency of 3 to 12 minutes, 20 hours per day. Major transit hubs are Richmond–Brighouse station, which is the hub for almost all Richmond bus routes, and Bridgeport station which is the hub for all bus routes from outlying suburbs. After the Canada Line closes at night, 24/7 service is provided by the N10 Nightbus every day of the week. The bus runs every 30 minutes, with the exception of one northbound trip (2am3am), during which service is at 60 minutes; service returns to 30 minutes after the northbound trip at 3am.

In September 2018, U-bicycle will launch a dockless bicycle sharing system in the city.

Vancouver International Airport (YVR), located on Sea Island, which is part of Richmond, to the north of Lulu Island, provides most of the air access to the region. Several float plane companies (including Salt Spring Air, Harbour Air and Seair Seaplanes) operate from the south terminal, providing service to the Gulf Islands and Vancouver Island. The airport is the second busiest in Canada and one of the busiest international airports on the West Coast of North America.

Health care
Health care in Richmond is overseen by the Vancouver Coastal Health Authority, which also covers the City of Vancouver, District of West Vancouver, City of North Vancouver, and District of North Vancouver as well as coastal regions of British Columbia. Richmond Hospital, located on the southeast corner of Westminster Highway and Gilbert Road, is undergoing redevelopment. In 2018 the Ministry of Health approved an 8 floor acute care tower redevelopment plan to replace the aging north tower. On 2 July 2020, the provincial government announced the acute care tower concept plan was being updated, with an additional floor (9 total) and announcement of expanded and renewed ER, ICU, Pharmacy, along with renovations to the south tower to include more inpatient psychiatric beds along with a psych ER.

The city is known internationally as the headquarters of the Canadian Hemochromatosis Society, and also as the city where the National Annual Hemochromatosis Awareness Month was initiated by former Mayor G. H. Blair in 1987.

Emergency services

The Richmond Fire Rescue Department, established in 1897, is responsible for providing both fire and extrication services in Richmond. Richmond Fire-Rescue has seven fire halls, and responds to fire-rescue calls and medical emergencies. It also provides emergency services at Vancouver International Airport. There are fire stations located in City Centre, Steveston, Cambie, Sea Island, Hamilton, Shellmont, and Crestwood.

The City of Richmond utilizes the Royal Canadian Mounted Police as its primary form of municipal law enforcement with their main detachment located on No 5 Road near the Ironwood area. The local RCMP also has community police stations located in City Centre, South Arm, and Steveston.

The British Columbia Ambulance Service provides the city with emergency medical response.

Education

Richmond is home to a campus of Kwantlen Polytechnic University, Sprott Shaw College and Trinity Western University. The British Columbia Institute of Technology also runs an aerospace technology campus in Sea Island near Vancouver International Airport.

Richmond has 10 secondary schools and 38 elementary schools, including three Montessori schools, two late French immersion schools, and six early French immersion schools. They are overseen by School District 38 Richmond. The district also hosts two International Baccalaureate programs, located at Richmond Secondary School and Hugh Boyd Secondary School.

The Conseil scolaire francophone de la Colombie-Britannique, headquartered in Richmond, operates one Francophone primary school in that city: école des Navigateurs.

Richmond International High School and College is a private school founded in 1991.

Media

Radio production
The Indo-Canadian radio station Sher-E-Punjab has its headquarters in Richmond.

Aberdeen Centre is home to Fairchild Radio, a radio station providing Mandarin and Cantonese speakers news, traffic and music.

Z95-3's studio is located in the Ironwood area of Richmond. The radio station provides Metro Vancouver listeners with hot adult contemporary, incorporating a mix of older songs with Top 40 hits.

Film and television production
Steveston Village has played home to several major American movies such as Blade II and The 6th Day, and television series such as The X-Files, Supernatural, The Secret Circle, The Outer Limits, Killer Instinct, Smallville, Stargate SG-1, the Final Destination series and the Scary Movie series. It is also the location for the fictitious town of Storybrooke in the ABC TV series Once Upon a Time.

Fantasy Gardens (an old amusement park which is relocated now) served as Halloweentown in the popular Disney Channel television movie Halloweentown II: Kalabar's Revenge and was also featured in the TV series Killer Instinct and Stargate SG-1. The television series Aliens in America and Life Unexpected also made use of Cambie Secondary School in the northern part of the city.

The exterior of the Workers' Compensation Board building (now the WorkSafeBC building) was used for the hospital in Stephen King's Kingdom Hospital. These exteriors can now be seen on the CBS series Eleventh Hour.

Vancouver International Airport on Richmond's Sea Island has also been featured in numerous films and television series, commonly standing in for Seattle-Tacoma International Airport (as it does in The Cleaner and Dead Like Me). It is also featured as stand-ins for other airports in films such as Final Destination, The Sisterhood of the Traveling Pants, The L Word, The Lizzie McGuire Movie, Fantastic Four: Rise of the Silver Surfer and Are We There Yet?

The Aerospace Technology Campus of BCIT, located just next to Vancouver International Airport, was used as a military academy mess hall for the live-action prequel series for the popular console game Halo 4 in Halo 4: Forward Unto Dawn. In addition, many other films, such as Rise of the Planet of the Apes and This Means War, were filmed there due to the directors taking a liking to the cement structure of the building, which makes for very official-looking sets.

Sister cities
Richmond's sister cities are:
 Pierrefonds-Roxboro (Montreal), Canada (since 1967)
 Wakayama, Japan (since 1973)
 Xiamen, China (since 2012)

Since 2008, Richmond has also a friendship city relationship with Qingdao, China.

Notable people

See also
Architecture of Greater Vancouver
Flag of Richmond, British Columbia

Notes

References

External links

 
Cities in British Columbia
Populated places in Greater Vancouver
Populated places on the British Columbia Coast
Populated places on the Fraser River